Prawit Prariwanta (born September 9, 1983) is a professional footballer from Thailand. He currently plays for Nakhon Pathom United in the Thai Division 1 League.

References

1983 births
Living people
Prawit Prariwanta
Prawit Prariwanta
Association football defenders
Prawit Prariwanta
Prawit Prariwanta
Prawit Prariwanta
Prawit Prariwanta
Prawit Prariwanta
Prawit Prariwanta
Prawit Prariwanta